This is a list of properties and districts in Johnson County, Georgia that are listed on the National Register of Historic Places (NRHP).

Current listings

|}

References

Johnson
Buildings and structures in Johnson County, Georgia